The Aston Martin AMR-One was a Le Mans Prototype sports car built by Prodrive's Aston Martin Racing arm.  The car was a successor to the Aston Martin DBR1-2.

Development

To meet the new regulations brought in by the ACO for endurance racing, the AMR-One is powered by a downsized, 2.0-litre turbocharged straight six petrol engine and features a blade-fin behind the cockpit. The AMR-One is built around a light carbon fibre monocoque chassis with open top bodywork, in contrast to the closed cockpits of the contemporary Peugeot 908 and Audi R18.

The car has a very high belt-line, broad shapes and few surface breaks. The front of the car is designed to develop minimal downforce and to force as much air into the ducts. The air then moves through the car instead of over the top. There are numerous ducts inside the high bodywork, one for brake cooling, two through the side vents and one for rear gearbox cooling. One air scoop is in place to feed the turbocharger. Two side ducts on the rear of the car are for rear-brake cooling. The exhaust exits at the bottom of the vertical fin.

Racing History

2011
Six cars were expected to be built, with Aston Martin Racing participating in several international endurance events in 2011, including the 24 Hours of Le Mans. At the 6 Hours of Castellet, the new AMR-One qualified 5 seconds behind the Pescarolo. In the race things took a downturn and the AMR-One finished way down the order. Further problems continued as they only completed a handful of laps at the Le Mans Test Day and were far slower than the top running LMP1 cars. The poor testing was followed by their withdrawal from the 1000 km Spa in order to continue private testing for Le Mans.  At the 24 Hours of Le Mans, the #009 car retired after only two laps, whilst the #007 car spent four hours in the pit before officially retiring, having driven only four laps. Aston Martin decided to skip the Imola round in favour of developing the car, earning them 3 DNS in 4 races and no points. At the 1,000 km of Silverstone, Aston Martin dropped the AMR-One and replaced them with their older but much faster Lola-Aston Martin B09/60.

Two of the AMR-One chassis were later sold to other programs. The DeltaWing project utilized an AMR-One chassis for the base of its radical design due to the team not needing to rehomologate a chassis which had already passed safety tests. A second AMR-One chassis was sold to Pescarolo Team for their use in developing the Pescarolo 03 LMP1 chassis.

Discontinuation
In January 2012, Aston Martin Racing announced they were ceasing development of the AMR-One and instead focusing once again on their GT program. Racing driver Darren Turner blamed the public development of the AMR-One and its rushed entry as its undoing citing that most teams develop their new cars completely behind closed doors for at least a year before attempting to race with them.

Gallery

References

External links
 Aston Martin Racing- AMR-One

AMR-One
Le Mans Prototypes
24 Hours of Le Mans race cars